Liakanjoki is a river in Finland. It is a distributary of Torne River. It departs from the main river in Karunki, Tornio.

Rivers of Finland
Torne river basin
Tornio